The Ripper Legacy is a mystery pastiche novel written by David Stuart Davies, featuring Sherlock Holmes and Dr. John Watson in a story with ties to Jack the Ripper.

Titan Books published the book in 2016, as part of its Further Adventures series, which collects a number of noted Holmesian pastiches.

Plot
A child has been abducted, yet there's no ransom note. When Holmes and Watson take up the case, they find a sinister connection to the heights of Victorian society. But just what is the missing child’s connection with the infamous killings in Whitechapel?

See also
 Sherlock Holmes pastiches
 A Study in Terror
 Dust and Shadow: An Account of the Ripper Killings by Dr. John H. Watson
 Murder by Decree

External links
The Ripper Legacy at Titan Books

2016 British novels
Novels set in Victorian England
Novels about Jack the Ripper
Sherlock Holmes pastiches
Sherlock Holmes novels
Titan Books titles